The Praderas Grand Prix or Gran Premio Las Praderas is a golf tournament on the TPG Argentina Tour, formerly the principal professional golf tour in Argentina. Founded in 1981, it has always been held at the Praderas de Lujan Golf Club in Luján, Buenos Aires Province. In 1981 the tournament played at 54 holes, in 1997 and 2010 at 36 holes. From 2005 to 2009 the tournament took part in the Progolf Circuit (36 holes tournament). In 2010, the tournament was played twice.

Winners

* – won following playoff

External links
TPG Tour official site

Golf tournaments in Argentina